.re is the Internet country code top-level domain (ccTLD) for Réunion (a French island located in the Indian Ocean, east of Madagascar). Along with .fr, .tf, and .ovh, it is administered by AFNIC.

In recent years, the .re TLD has been increasingly used for real estate–related domains (RE = Real Estate), including place names (neighborhoods, cities, countries, etc.), real estate companies, developers/projects, property-related websites, and individual realtors and estate agents around the world. The .re domain has also been applied to insurance and reinsurance companies (e.g. swiss.re), those involved with reverse engineering, and as domain hacks for words ending in .re (for example, adventu.re or nearfutu.re), similar to contractions used with other TLDs (for example, websites such as bit.ly and delicio.us). Domains with the .re TLD can be registered with some of the largest online registrars such as Name.com, as well as most European domain registrars.

Since 6 December 2011, the rules for registering French domains have shifted. The owner of a domain no longer needs to be based in France or Overseas France anymore, with all individuals, companies and organizations residing in the European Union able register domains of France or its possessions.

Two-character domains
.re allows two-character domains with at least one number. So, m7.re or 42.re are acceptable, while fi.re is not.

Second-level domains
In addition to direct second level registrations, registrations have been made at the third level beneath these names:

 .asso.re: associations
 .nom.re: surnames
 .com.re: commercial (unrestricted registration)
 .can.re: Unconditional and Undocumented (Registrar: Yöncü Bilişim Çözümleri)

Starting December 6, 2011, domain names at the official subdomains can no longer be registered. The owner of such domain names can renew their existing domains.

See also
 .eu: CC TLD for the European Union
 .fr: CC TLD for the Republic of France
 Internet in France
 ISO 3166-2:RE

References

External links
 IANA .re whois information
 AFNIC
 Charte de nommage des extensions françaises

Country code top-level domains
Réunion
Council of European National Top Level Domain Registries members

sv:Toppdomän#R